"The Christmas Invasion" is a 60-minute special episode of the British science fiction television series Doctor Who, which was first broadcast on BBC One on 25 December 2005. This episode features the first full-episode appearance of David Tennant as the Tenth Doctor and is also the first specially produced Doctor Who Christmas special in the programme's history.

In the episode, principally set in London, the alien race the Sycorax invade Earth, demanding that either humanity surrenders or one third of them will die.

Plot

The newly regenerated Tenth Doctor takes Rose back to her old estate, and collapses in front of Mickey and Jackie. They take the Doctor to Jackie's flat where they put him to bed. Mickey and Rose go Christmas shopping, but this is cut short when they are attacked by robot Father Christmases using trombones and flamethrowers. The couple get a taxi back to the Powell Estate where they discover a new, unfamiliar Christmas tree; Rose senses something is wrong with this new tree. The tree starts spinning with razor-sharp blades, Rose, Mickey and Jackie shelter in the room with the coma-tose Doctor. The Doctor wakes up and destroys the homicidal tree with his Sonic Screwdriver, before warding off further attack by the robot Father Christmases. However, the Doctor is soon unconscious again, but he warns Rose, Mickey and Jackie that something is coming before passing out again. 

Early on Christmas morning, the Mars space probe Guinevere One is intercepted by a giant spaceship heading for Earth. When the probe's broadcast is shown on Earth, the face of a Sycorax appears. He demands Earth's surrender and uses blood control to cause a third of the world's population to go into a hypnotic state. The Sycorax threatens to make these people commit suicide unless half of the world's population is given to the Sycorax as slaves. Harriet Jones, the Prime Minister, attempts further negotiations with the Sycorax, and is teleported aboard the ship, along with Major Richard Blake, Daniel Llewellyn and Alex Klein. 

Rose, Mickey and Jackie evacuate the Doctor to the TARDIS as the Sycorax ship approaches London. Before Jackie can return with additional supplies, the TARDIS is detected by the Sycorax and is teleported aboard their ship. Rose buys enough time for the Doctor to finally recover, after inhaling the fumes from a dropped flask of tea. The Doctor shuts down the Sycorax blood control and then challenges the Sycorax leader to a sword fight for the Earth. The leader severs the Doctor's hand, which he immediately re-grows, then forces the Sycorax leader to submit. The leader attempts to attack the Doctor from behind. The Doctor hits a sensor with a satsuma he found, triggering part of the wing to fold and dropping the leader to his death.

The Doctor orders the Sycorax to leave Earth and never return before taking Rose, Mickey, and Harriet back to Earth. As the Sycorax ship moves away, Harriet orders Torchwood to destroy the ship. The Doctor becomes furious with Harriet, who justifies her actions by reminding the Doctor that he is not always there to save them. The Doctor threatens to bring down her government with six words. He whispers to Harriet's aide Alex: "Don't you think she looks tired?"

After choosing a new outfit, the Doctor joins Rose, Jackie, and Mickey for Christmas dinner. They watch Harriet on television fending off rumours about her health, with a vote of confidence looming.

Production
This special was the first full episode starring David Tennant as the Tenth Doctor; he was only shown briefly at the end of "The Parting of the Ways" for the regeneration sequence. A 7-minute "mini-episode", set between "The Parting of the Ways" and "The Christmas Invasion", was shown as part of the Children in Need charity telethon on 18 November 2005. The Christmas special is a tradition in British television series. While this is the first story for Doctor Who clearly labelled as a Christmas special, the seventh episode of The Daleks' Master Plan, titled "The Feast of Steven", was written as a Christmas episode, even featuring a fourth wall-breaking Christmas wish to the viewers by William Hartnell. Christmas specials became an annual staple for Doctor Who, until 2018, where it was replaced by a New Years special. Although not shown at Christmas, "The Unquiet Dead" was set on Christmas Eve, 1869.

The Tenth Doctor speaks with an Estuary English accent, in contrast to the Ninth Doctor's Northern one. In a 23 December interview on BBC Radio 1, Tennant explained that a line had been scripted for the Christmas special explaining that the newly regenerated Doctor had imprinted on Rose's accent, "like a chick hatching from an egg," but the line was cut from the final programme.

The episode's opening shot is a repeat of the opening shot of "Rose". The cone-shaped building which has all its glass blown out from the ship's shockwave is 30 St Mary Axe, also known as the Swiss Re Building or "The Gherkin". The climactic scenes of the episode were shot on location at Wallis House, Brentford, one of the Golden Mile's few remaining Art Deco buildings. Parts of the episode were filmed at the Clearwell Caves in Gloucestershire.
The prototype of the Sycorax swords was auctioned on eBay to raise funds for the Great Ormond Street Hospital Children's Charity. It raised £920.51. During the live broadcast, the front page of the official BBC website stated: "THE CHRISTMAS INVASION is on BBC One NOW. HARRIET JONES SAYS: Switch this website off for Britain." The tie-in website "Who is Doctor Who?" was also updated with a message from Mickey referencing the Guinevere One website, and an appeal to the Doctor to bring back Rose.

Music
The song playing during the wardrobe sequence, "Song for Ten" (named in reference to the Tenth Doctor), was composed by Murray Gold for the episode and sung by Tim Phillips. The closing credits had a new theme arrangement restoring the traditional "middle eight" section of the theme which had been omitted in the 2005 series. This was performed by the BBC National Orchestra of Wales, conducted by Gold. This arrangement was subsequently used for the closing titles of the 2006 series.

Various pieces of music featured in this episode were released in December 2006 as part of the Doctor Who Soundtrack (produced by Silva Screen). These included the "Song for Ten", the music played behind Harriet Jones' speech and the music played as the spaceship arrives over London.

Cast notes
Lachele Carl reappears as the reporter seen in "Aliens of London" / "World War Three". She is later seen in "The Sound of Drums", "The Poison Sky", "Turn Left", "The Stolen Earth" and The Sarah Jane Adventures story Revenge of the Slitheen.

Broadcast and home media
Overnight ratings for the episode gave a peak viewing audience of 9.8 million viewers, and an average of 9.4 — the second highest rated programme of the evening, behind EastEnders. This episode was the highest-rated episode of the Tenth Doctor era, with final ratings at 9.84 million, up until the "Voyage of the Damned", which achieved an audience of 13.8 million viewers. It is considered one of the best Christmas specials of the show. In 2014, over 7,000 readers of Radio Times voted "The Christmas Invasion" as the greatest Doctor Who  Christmas special with over a quarter of the votes going to it, 24.92%, a whole 10% more votes than the second favourite.

Immediately after "The Christmas Invasion", digital viewers were able to press their red button to view a special interactive episode, "Attack of the Graske" written by Gareth Roberts and starring Tennant as the Doctor.

The Canadian presentation on the CBC on 26 December 2005 was hosted by Piper, who was attired for the occasion in a red Roots "Canada" sweatshirt. The episode was scheduled in a 90-minute-long slot; as the episode and the presentations took less than the allotted time, the rest of the broadcast was filled with the start of two episodes of the animated programme Creature Comforts, which was set for the following 30-minute slot. The special premiered on BBC America in 2007. Unlike the Sci-Fi version, the episode was edited down to fit inside a one-hour timeslot with commercial breaks.

This episode was released together with "New Earth" as a basic DVD with no special features on 1 May 2006, and as part of a second series boxset on 20 November 2006. This release included an in-vision commentary with Russell T Davies, Julie Gardner (Head of Drama for BBC Wales) and Phil Collinson, recorded before the story aired. This commentary was also made available as an MP3 on the BBC Doctor Who website.

The ten Christmas specials between "The Christmas Invasion" and "Last Christmas" inclusive were released in a boxset titled Doctor Who – The 10 Christmas Specials on 19 October 2015.

Pre-release publicity
On 3 December 2005, the annual Christmas edition of the BBC's listings magazine Radio Times was released, featuring a Doctor Who cover to tie-in with "The Christmas Invasion". This was the first time Doctor Who had featured on the Christmas edition cover in the show's forty-two-year history, and the first Christmas cover for an individual BBC television drama since EastEnders in 1986. The Christmas Radio Times cover usually features artwork of a generic Christmas scene. As confirmed by Russell T Davies in the episode commentary, the Doctor Who section of that issue of the Radio Times contains a hidden message explaining what saves the Doctor: many of the paragraphs in the articles have an oversized first letter, which taken consecutively spell out "A cup of tea" (in the manner of an acrostic).

The Episode was included as part of the "Christopher Eccleston and David Tennant" box set in 2020, containing this episode and all other episodes of the era, plus hours of DVD extras like documentaries, commentaries and more.

Commercial releases

In print

A novelisation of this story written by Jenny T. Colgan including the storyline from the 2005 Children in Need special was released in paperback and digital formats 5 April 2018 as part of the Target Collection.

See also
List of fictional prime ministers of the United Kingdom

References

External links

Commentary track by Phil Collinson, Russell T Davies and Julie Gardner (MP3)

2005 British television episodes
2005 television specials
Doctor Who Christmas specials
Doctor Who serials novelised by Jenny Colgan
Doctor Who stories set on Earth
Tenth Doctor episodes
Television shows written by Russell T Davies
UNIT serials
Television episodes set in London